Camila is a 1984 Argentine drama film directed by María Luisa Bemberg, based on the story of the 19th-century Argentine socialite Camila O'Gorman. The story had previously been adapted in 1910 by Mario Gallo, in the now considered lost film Camila O'Gorman. It was nominated for the Academy Award for Best Foreign Language Film, marking the second time an Argentine film was nominated for this award.

It was selected as the second greatest Argentine film of all time in a poll conducted by the Museo del Cine Pablo Ducrós Hicken in 2000. In a new version of the survey organized in 2022 by the specialized magazines La vida util, Taipei and La tierra quema, presented at the Mar del Plata International Film Festival, the film reached the 23 position. Also in 2022, the film was included in Spanish magazine Fotogramass list of the 20 best Argentine films of all time.

Plot
The film opens with "In memory of Camila O'Gorman and Ladislao Gutiérrez".

Argentina, c. 1827: Ana Perichon de O'Gorman is brought from a Brazilian convent to house arrest where she is confined to her room in the hacienda of her estranged son, Adolfo O'Gorman. Adolfo, who despises his mother for having had an adulterous affair decades earlier, treats her with unveiled contempt. Camila, a baby when her grandmother arrives, later also initially rejects her grandmother. When Ana asks Camila whether she enjoys love stories, the girl responds that she doesn't know any.

In 1847, Camila (Susú Pecoraro) is a Buenos Aires socialite. Having been raised on her grandmother's stories about her affair with former Colonial Viceroy Santiago de Liniers and their surviving love letters, Camila secretly reads French romance novels and books by political refugees like Esteban Echeverría. She is courted by Ignacio, a wealthy man with whom she is not in love. Her fellow socialites, who see marriage as a business arrangement, urge her to not let Ignacio get away. In reply, Camila bursts into tears as she describes her longing to marry for love and for a husband she could feel proud. Her socialite friends are stunned.

Meanwhile, Adolfo has come to enthusiastically support the far-right single party state led by Caudillo Juan Manuel de Rosas, whom Adolfo praises for restoring order after the Argentine civil wars of the 1810s and 1820s. Camila, however, is horrified by the state terrorism which Rosas routinely uses against real and imagined opposition. She openly expresses these views, which always enrages her father, who constantly reprimands her for doing things that are "not for women." One day, during confession, she meets a Jesuit priest, Father Ladislao Gutiérrez (Imanol Arias). Camila immediately develops a crush on him, but after hearing Fr. Ladislao furiously denounce Rosas' death squads from the pulpit as she wishes she could, she falls deeply in love. Fr. Ladislao first rebukes Camila when she comes on to him and feels deeply ashamed that he returns her feelings. He attempts to do penance with a whip before sinking into a life-threatening fever.

During the funeral of her grandmother, Camila learns that Fr. Ladislao is ill and rushes to his bedside. To her shock, she finds him caressing a handkerchief which she had given him, ostensibly as a gift to the poor but really as a token of love. She also kisses him on the lips, and he did not resist it. Upon his recovery, Fr. Ladislao finally surrenders to Camila's advances. For a time, they conduct a discreet affair, but Fr. Ladislao is visibly troubled by the hypocrisy of his public priesthood and his private violation of his vows.

Abandoning everything, Fr. Ladislao and Camila elope to Corrientes Province, where they pose as a married couple. Fr. Ladislao works as a school teacher and swiftly gains the admiration and gratitude of the village. Camila and Ladislao live in a small house on the side of a road. At one moment, a religious procession passes by the house and seems to cast a shadow over the couple. Later, Camila is ecstatically happy and tells Ladislao how proud she is to be his "wife." However, Ladislao remains torn between his love for Camila and a deep longing for his abandoned priesthood. During an Easter fiesta, Ladislao is recognized by Father Miguel Gannon, a Buenos Aires priest who angrily greets him with the words, "God does not forget his chosen. Do you hear me, Father Ladislao Gutiérrez?" With his troubled conscience brought to a crisis, Fr. Ladislao runs to the village church and screams at the Eucharist in the tabernacle "Why can't You leave me in peace!" Meanwhile, Father Gannon notifies the village's police commandante.

The latter, feeling grateful to Ladislao for teaching his children to read, warns Camila that he will do nothing until morning. He urges her and Ladislao to immediately flee across the Brazilian border. Deeply grateful, Camila frantically searches for Fr. Ladislao to tell him the news. When she finds him kneeling in prayer before the altar of the church, she bursts into tears, knowing that he has made his peace with God.

The next morning, Fr. Ladislao returns to Camila to say goodbye. Although he says that he still loves her, Fr. Ladislao explains that he must return to Buenos Aires, do penance, and continue his priestly ministry. Visibly ashamed, he apologizes to Camila for what he has done to her. Saddened but unremorseful, she responds, "I knew what I was doing." To both their horror, the "Commandante" and his men arrive and arrest them both.

Meanwhile, Camila's father, Adolfo O'Gorman, is infuriated by how the family name has been dragged through the mud by Camila's actions. Despite the pleas of Ignacio and the rest of the family, he writes to Rosas and demands the death penalty for his daughter. With the Church Hierarchy and his political allies demanding retribution, and his exiled opponents exploiting the scandal, for political gain, Rosas issues a decree that both Camila and Fr. Ladislao are to be shot without trial.

In a military prison, Camila and Fr. Ladislao are forbidden to see each other. While imprisoned, Camila learns that she is carrying Fr. Ladislao's child. Heartbroken, she calls out from her cell, "Ladislao! We are going to have a baby! We are going to have a baby!" Despite the fact that the Law of Argentina forbids the execution of pregnant women, Rosas refuses to delay Camila's death sentence. After begging the prison chaplain to save her unborn child, the chaplain gives Camila glass of holy water to drink and thus baptizes her unborn child. Fr. Ladislao sends her a final letter affirming his love for her and saying that, because they could not be together on earth, they will be reunited in heaven before the throne of God.

On August 18, 1848, Camila and Fr. Ladislao are tied to chairs, blindfolded, and carried before a firing squad in the prison courtyard side by side. The soldiers gun down Fr. Ladislao without hesitation, but they initially balk at killing a pregnant woman. When the Commandante threatens to shoot them if they refuse to obey God's will (as interpreted by Rosas), they open fire, riddle Camila's stomach with bullets, and place both bodies into the same coffin. The camera pans over the soldiers, the courtyard, and the Argentine flag, before lingering over Camila and Ladislao's coffin. Their final words are repeated in voiceover: "Ladislao, are you there?", "By your side, Camila".

Cast
 Susú Pecoraro as Camila O'Gorman
 Imanol Arias as Fr. Ladislao Gutiérrez
 Héctor Alterio as Adolfo O'Gorman
 Elena Tasisto as Joaquina O'Gorman
 Claudio Gallardou as Fr. Eduardo O'Gorman
 Carlos Muñoz as Monsignor Elortondo
 Héctor Pellegrini as Commandant Soto
 Boris Rubaja as Ignacio, Camila's suitor

Influences
Bemberg intended to fictionalize Camila O'Gorman as both a proto-feminist and a hopeless romantic, as opposed to the official history of a woman seduced and virtually kidnapped by her lover. No actor portrays the dictator Juan Manuel de Rosas and his actions are inferred only from the statements of other characters. This, and his constant presence in portraits, have caused some film critics to compare him to the ubiquitous Big Brother from George Orwell's dystopian novel Nineteen Eighty-Four.

One of the themes of the film is political censorship and filming ironically started on 10 December 1983, the day Democracy was re-established in Argentina.

During their elopement, Fr. Ladislao and Camila have sexual relations inside a horse-drawn coach. This is derived from a similar scene in the novel Madame Bovary by Gustav Flaubert.

Historical inaccuracy

 In the film, the Catholic Church in Argentina is depicted as unconditionally supporting Rosas' dictatorial rule. Father Ladislao Gutierrez is inaccurately depicted as the sole exception among the clergy. From his first appearance at Camila's birthday celebration, Fr. Gutierrez is rebuked by his fellow Jesuits for not wearing the Scarlet insignia of the ruling Federalist Party. One of his superiors then pins the Rosista badge on the cassock of the visibly uncomfortable young priest. Later, when he denounces Rosas' police state tactics from the pulpit during Mass, the senior Jesuit pastor of the parish also rebukes him. In reality, the Society of Jesus, in which both Fr. Gutierrez and Camila's brother were priests, was the only institution within Argentine Catholicism which actually had a policy of speaking out. Their vocal criticism of his rule ultimately caused Rosas to sign a decree expelling all Jesuits from Argentina. Furthermore, Camila's brother, Fr. Eduardo O'Gorman, went into exile in Montevideo after the summary execution of his sister and only returned to his homeland after the 1852 defeat of Rosas at the Battle of Caseros and the Caudillo's subsequent overthrow.
 Camila's father, Adolfo O'Gorman, is depicted as a tyrannical and self-righteous autocrat who, in the words of one reviewer, "makes Elizabeth Barrett Browning's father look like Santa Claus." Adolfo's response to Camila's elopement is to blame her for the scandal which has ruined his good name. Adolfo's hatred of his daughter and obsession with making her pay causes Camila's mother to curse the day she married him. More recent scholars have attempted to paint a different picture of Adolfo O'Gorman. In a letter to Rosas sent immediately following his daughter's elopement, Adolfo O'Gorman placed the blame squarely on Fr. Ladislao Gutierrez, who, he claimed, had seduced his daughter, "under the guise of religion". Adolfo further described himself and his family as heartbroken and pleaded that his daughter be rescued from the man he regarded as her abductor. Scholars who have read the letter believe that Adolfo genuinely loved his daughter.
 When her husband refuses to ask for clemency for their daughter, Camila's mother laments that no one cares about her daughter's life. Adolfo, she says, cares only about his honor, while Rosas, the Federalist Party, and the Church care only about maintaining power, and the Unitarian Party cares only about using the scandal for political gain. "But no one", she screams, "cares about my daughter!" In reality, the Leader's own daughter, Camila's close friend Manuela Rosas, begged her father to grant clemency. Rosas' decision to ignore their pleas and execute a pregnant woman horrified his supporters, sent shock waves across Argentina, and, according to some historians, contributed to his overthrow and exile in 1852. Historian Manuel Bilbao later commented, "It would have been better for Rosas to have lost a battle than to shoot Camila, such was the damage which he did to his prestige and authority."

In popular culture
In 2001, Camila: The Musical, based on the film and with words and music written by Lori McKelvey, debuted in Philadelphia.

Camila is featured in the book Pop Culture in Latin America and the Caribbean written by Elizabeth Gackstetter Nichols and Timothy R. Robbins. The book explores the film and the significance it had.

See also 
 List of submissions to the 57th Academy Awards for Best Foreign Language Film
 List of Argentine submissions for the Academy Award for Best Foreign Language Film

References

External links
 

1984 films
1984 romantic drama films
Argentine romantic drama films
Epic films based on actual events
Films about Catholic priests
Films about clerical celibacy
Films about religious violence
Films critical of the Catholic Church
Films critical of Christianity and Christians
Films critical of religion
Films directed by María Luisa Bemberg
Films set in 1827
Films set in 1847
Films set in 1848
Films set in Buenos Aires
Historical epic films
Romantic epic films
1980s Spanish-language films